Maksymilian Tkocz (born 26 January 2002) is a Polish professional footballer who plays as a centre-back for Odra Opole.

Career statistics

Club

Notes

References

2002 births
Living people
Polish footballers
Poland youth international footballers
Association football defenders
I liga players
II liga players
III liga players
Górnik Zabrze players
Legia Warsaw players
Lech Poznań II players
Lech Poznań players
Odra Opole players